Metisella meninx, the marsh sylph, is a butterfly of the family Hesperiidae. It is endemic to the wet vleis (shallow lakes) of highland grassland in northern KwaZulu-Natal, Mpumalanga, Gauteng, the northern part of the Free State and the extreme east of the North West Province. It has become extinct in many areas close to Johannesburg due to building developments.

The wingspan is 26–28 mm for males and 27–29 mm for females. Adults are on wing from December to March (with a peak from January to February). There is one extended generation per year. Both sexes feed from flowers, those recorded including Scabiosa columbaria, Persicaria attenuata, Veronica anagallis-aquatica and Conyza podocephala. Males occasionally drink from damp spots with decaying vegetation.

The larvae feed on Poaceae marsh grass species, including Leersia hexandra.

References

Butterflies described in 1873
Heteropterinae
Butterflies of Africa
Taxa named by Roland Trimen